Figari (also ) is a commune in the French department of Corse-du-Sud on the island of Corsica, France.

Geography
The commune comes from an ancient parish. It includes the center of a large plain where the airport was built in 1975. To the north looms Mount Cagna, which exceeds .

To the southwest the commune occupies the east bank of the Bay of Figari, and Ventilegne Point, but not the resort.

Climate
Figari has a hot-summer mediterranean climate (Köppen climate classification Csa).

Population

Economy
Viticulture has been practiced in Figari since the Roman era. The wine produced falls under the Vin de Corse-Figari AOC.

Transportation
The airport, Figari Sud-Corse Airport, is the third largest of Corsica. In 2004 it carried 254,000 passengers, 117,000 between the airport and Paris, 63,000 to or from Marseille, 34,000 to or from Nice, and 37,000 in charters.

See also
Communes of the Corse-du-Sud department

References

Communes of Corse-du-Sud
Corse-du-Sud communes articles needing translation from French Wikipedia